HMS Swiftsure was a 74-gun third-rate ship of the line of the Royal Navy, launched from Bucklers Hard on 23 July 1804.

She fought at Trafalgar. Coincidentally the French 74-gun ship Swiftsure also took part in the battle; she had originally been a British ship that the French had captured in 1801.

This Swiftsure became a receiving ship in 1819, In September 1844, she heeled over and sank at Portchester, Hampshire. In November 1844, she was in use as a target ship by HMS Excellent. She was sold out of the service in 1845.

Notes

References

 Lavery, Brian (2003) The Ship of the Line - Volume 1: The development of the battlefleet 1650–1850. Conway Maritime Press. .

External links
 

Ships of the line of the Royal Navy
Swiftsure-class ships of the line
Ships built on the Beaulieu River
1804 ships
Maritime incidents in September 1844